In statistics, kernel-independent component analysis (kernel ICA) is an efficient algorithm for independent component analysis which estimates source components by optimizing a generalized variance contrast function, which is based on representations in a reproducing kernel Hilbert space. Those contrast functions use the notion of mutual information as a measure of statistical independence.

Main idea

 

 

for fixed . It follows then that the -correlation between two  independent random variables is zero.

This notion of -correlations is used for defining contrast functions that are optimized in the Kernel ICA algorithm.

References

Statistical algorithms